The 2002 Brownlow Medal was the 75th year the award was presented to the player adjudged the fairest and best player during the Australian Football League (AFL) home-and-away season. Simon Black of the Brisbane Lions won the medal by polling twenty-five votes during the 2002 AFL season.

Leading vote-getters 
* The player was ineligible to win the medal due to suspension by the AFL Tribunal during the year.

References 

Brownlow Medal
2002
Brownlow Medal